St. John's College (SJC) is a Roman Catholic high school located in Brantford, Ontario, Canada.As with many Catholic schools, school uniforms are mandatory during school hours. Regardless of their religious affiliations several courses in theology/religious studies are also mandatory for students attending SJC.

 

In June 2014, Holy Trinity Catholic High School's long-time musical art teacher, John Nicholson, was appointed the new vice-principal of St. John's to replace Mr. Cacilhas, who was appointed to Holy Trinity.

 

History

In 1941, Brantford Catholic High School opened in the basement of St. Ann's Elementary School with just one Grade 9 class. A new class was added each year until 1951 when the school moved to Dufferin Avenue.

 

From 1951 to 1978, the priests of the [[Congregation of the Resurrection]] acted as the principals.

 

In 1959, the school's name changed to St. John's College.

 

In the 1970-71 school year, St. John's College absorbed with Providence College at the present day Paris Road location.

 

In the 1980s, the student population had grown so much that several expansions were added to the building. A new cafeteria, triple gym, teacher lounge, and 13 classrooms were constructed with help from community fundraising. In 1989, more additions were made with the addition of the current main entrance, 9 classrooms, administrative offices, the 'cafetorium', health center and guidance center. In 1991, enrolment exceeded 1700 students. This necessitated the opening of [[Assumption College School (Brantford)|Assumption College]] in September, 1992, as well as [[Holy Trinity Catholic High School (Simcoe)|Holy Trinity Catholic High School]] in [[Simcoe, Ontario]] in 2001.

 

==Athletics==

The team name for all St. John's teams is the St. John's Green Eagles. A few Eagles teams throughout the year include [[basketball]], [[soccer]], [[cheerleading]], [[rugby football|rugby]], [[volleyball]], [[american football|football]], [[baseball]], [[softball]], [[track and field]], [[golf]], [[amateur wrestling|wrestling]], [[badminton]], [[curling]], [[fly fishing]] and [[tennis]]. The 2009 senior girls' basketball team captured the AAAA [[OFSAA]] gold medal on November 28, 2009. The Eagles finished the season with a perfect 45-0 record.

 

==Other extracurricular activities==

St. John's College is steeped in the arts, particularly drama and music. The music program is very well respected and has received numerous honours, including gold standing in the regional and national [[MusicFest]] competitions. The Drama department is known for its ambitious major productions, including ''[[Cats (musical)|Cats]]'', ''[[Fame (musical)|Fame]]'', ''[[Little Shop of Horrors (musical)|Little Shop of Horrors]]'', ''[[Our Town]]'', ''[[Godspell]]'', ''[[Into the Woods]]'', ''[[Evita (musical)|Evita]]'', ''[[Footloose (musical)|Footloose]]'', ''[[Kiss Me, Kate]]'', ''[[Disco Inferno (musical)|Disco Inferno]]'', ''[[Back to the 80s (musical)|Back to the 80s]]'', and ''[[Guys and Dolls (musical)|Guys and Dolls]]''. For a short while, St. John's major musical productions of ''[[Jesus Christ Superstar]]'' (1995), ''[[Joseph and the Amazing Technicolor Dreamcoat]]'' (1996), and ''[[Peter Pan]]'' (1998) were produced at the Brantford Sanderson Centre for the Performing Arts.

 

During the production of ''Joseph'', the Saturday night performance was stopped in the middle of the "Close Every Door" scene due to a bomb threat, which was later attributed to a student at the school, who was arrested and charged.

 

''Evita'' was presented in 2008 at the Sanderson Centre from May 28–31.

 

Also notable is the school's yearly participation in the Sears Drama Festival, which has brought the department several awards of excellence.

 

St. John's College is the only secondary school in Brantford with a debate team, and placed first in the categories of Debate Team and Individual Debator in 2008 through the regional tournament of the Ontario Student Debating Union.

 

The school's Mirror Team

See also
List of high schools in Ontario

References

St. John's College

External links
St. John's College
Brant Haldimand Norfolk Catholic District School Board

Catholic secondary schools in Ontario
High schools in Brantford
Educational institutions established in 1941
1941 establishments in Ontario